The frula, also known as svirala (свирала) or jedinka, is a musical instrument which resembles a medium sized flute, traditionally played in rural Southeast Europe, primarily South Slavic countries. It is an end-blown aerophone with six holes, typically made of wood. The frula is a traditional instrument of South Slavic shepherds, who would play while tending their flocks.

For a list of similar instruments, see the section below.

Names
In Croatia, it is also commonly known as "jedinka". Other local names in Croatia include žveglica, šaltva, kavela, ćurlik. In English, the instrument has also simply been called the "Serbian flute".

Overview
The frula is a small wooden flute with six holes. In rural Southeast Europe, the frula was played by shepherds while tending their flocks. It is a traditional instrument of Serbia, one of several aerophones used for leisure time, rituals, or accompanying the kolo (circle dance), along with long flutes (duduk, cevara), the double flute (dvojnice), and the bag-pipe (gajde).

Legacy
There are many events dedicated to the frula, such as the Prva pastirska frula in Jagnjilo, Dani Save Jeremića in Ražanj, sabori frulaša in Lelić and Prislonica, takmičenja frulaša in Iđoš, and  Frula fest in Kruševac.

A popular Serbian folk song is Ej čija frula ("O, whose frula"), recorded by, among others, Braća Bajić, Radiša Urošević and Cune Gojković.

Other similar flutes
 shvi, Armenia
 sopilka, Ukraine
 lamzdeliai, Lithuania
 floghera, Greece
 furulya, Hungary
 fujarka, Poland
 kaval, Turkey
 balaban or duduk, double-reed, Armenia and Azerbaijan

References

Fipple flutes
Croatian musical instruments
Serbian musical instruments
Croatian music
Serbian music